A saccharimeter is an instrument for measuring the concentration of sugar solutions.

This is commonly achieved using a measurement of refractive index (refractometer) or the angle of rotation of polarization of optically active sugars (polarimeter).

Saccharimeters are used in food processing industries, brewing, and the distilled alcoholic drinks industry.

External links

Historical
 Bates Type Saccharimeter NIST Museum object.

Measuring instruments